Kwid or KWID may refer to:

 KWID, a commercial radio station that is licensed to Las Vegas, Nevada
 Mohammad Kwid (born 1956), Syrian football manager and former player
 Renault Kwid, an entry-level crossover produced by the French car manufacturer Renault

See also 
 Quid (disambiguation)